East Carlton is a village and civil parish in the county of Northamptonshire, on the southern ridge overlooking the Welland valley to the north and covers  on a long strip of land. At the time of the 2001 census, the parish's population was 270, reducing to 259 at the 2011 census. East Carlton is one of the Thankful Villages that suffered no fatalities during World War I. Although in Northamptonshire, the village is in the Leicestershire LE16 postcode area.

History
The village's name means 'Free peasants' farm/settlement'.

It is thought that Carlton was first occupied by the Danes. In the Domesday Book of 1087, the village of Carlton is referred to as Carlintone. A number of families owned land and estates throughout the centuries, including the Hotots, De Kirkeby and the Palmers. Until 1660, the settlement of Carlton was divided into two manors, East Hall and West Hall. East Hall is thought to have stood where the present hall stands. There is no trace of the West Hall, its stone may have been used as building material for later structures.

East Carlton Hall and grounds
In 1776/1778 Sir John Palmer, 5th Baronet, commissioned John Johnson, a Leicester architect to design a new hall. It was built on the foundations of the previous hall and was enlarged by Sir John Henry Palmer, 7th Baronet, in 1817, after which it was leased to a variety of notable tenants. It was further rebuilt in 1870 by the architect Edmund Francis Law, with red brick and ironstone in the style of a French château and replaced a Palladian house of 1778. It is said that the stone wall which surrounds the south and east of the parkland was the re-used stone of the old Hall.The hall is now referred to as East Carlton Hall, and is a Grade II listed building with extensive grounds overlooking the Welland Valley.

In the early 20th century large deposits of iron ore were found in the area. By 1936 the hall was converted into a hostel for unmarried bachelor staff. As the steel works expanded the directors began a house building programme to accommodate future employees. Part of the grounds of the hall were used to build housing for senior staff and 59 houses were built during 1934 and 1935, making up a large part of East Carlton as it is known today. The original village is situated west of the hall grounds.

Stewarts & Lloyds, together with other steel manufacturers were nationalised in the 1960s becoming British Steel Corporation. The steel industry was later rationalised leading to the end of steel manufacturing in Corby in 1979. The house and grounds were later acquired by Corby Borough Council. The house has now been sold as a family home and is not open to the public. The grounds have now become a country park open to the public.

East Carlton Country Park
The park attracts over 400,000 visitors each year, according to Corby Borough Council, from the local area of Corby, Kettering, Market Harborough and further afield. The Country Park has a heritage centre which contains models and historical information about the Corby Steelworks. It has extensive parking, a play park and café.

Other buildings

The church dedicated to St Peter dates from 1788 and is Grade I listed. There is a monument to Sir Geoffrey Palmer, 1st Baronet (d.1673) and his wife.

There is a terrace of almshouses north of the church rebuilt in the Tudor style in 1866. Both this and the Rectory (1873) are by architect Edmund Francis Law who also rebuilt the Hall in 1870.

See also
 Palmer baronets, of Carlton (1660)
 Carlton Curlieu Hall, Leicestershire

References

Villages in Northamptonshire
Country houses in Northamptonshire
History of Northamptonshire
Tourist attractions in Northamptonshire
Civil parishes in Northamptonshire
North Northamptonshire